Bryan Nickson Lomas (born 30 June 1990 in Kuching, Sarawak) is a former Malaysian diver. Lomas was the youngest Malaysian athlete to qualify for 2004 Summer Olympics when he was 14. He became the country's first world junior diving champion after winning gold at the 3 m springboard event in the World Junior Championships held at Belem, Brazil in 2004. He trained under the coaching of Yang Zhuliang. Lomas is named after the footballer Bryan Robson by his father.

Career
At the age of 14, Lomas was the second youngest athlete to compete in the 2004 Summer Olympics in Athens, Greece and was the flag-bearer of Malaysia in the opening ceremony. He competed in the 10 meter platform event in which with 407.13 points he finished at 19th spot. In the 2005 SEA Games held in the Philippines, Lomas won the gold medal for the 10 m platform event and silver for 10 m synchronised platform event alongside James Sandayud.

Lomas represented Malaysia in diving in the 2007 World Aquatics Championships held in Melbourne, Australia. He entered in the 10 m platform event and ranked seventh in the final standings with 469.25 points. This seventh-place finish ensured him a berth for 2008 Beijing Olympics. In 2006, Lomas along with teammate James Sandayud entered the Synchronised 10m Platform Competition and won Silver in the 2006 Commonwealth Games in Melbourne, Australia. He earned 9th in the 10 m platform diving event finals at the 2006 Asian Games held in Doha, Qatar.

Lomas competed in the 2008 Summer Olympics in Beijing, China, qualifying for the 10 metre platform after finishing seventh in the 2007 World Aquatics Championships. In the event, Lomas earned only 384.35 points, and eliminated in the preliminary round. He finished at the 26th spot. In December 2009, Lomas won gold medals for both 10 m platform event and the 3 m synchronised springboard event with teammate Yeoh Ken Nee.

Competing in the 2010 Commonwealth Games held in Delhi, India, he won bronze in the 10m Individual Platform competition and finished 7th in both the 3m Individual Platform and 1m Individual Platform competition. For Synchronised Diving, he, together with teammate Yeoh Ken Nee, won bronze in the Synchronised 3m Platform Competition.

Lomas competed in the 2010 Asian Games held in the Guangzhou, China. Lomas entered in three events: 10 m platform, synchronised 3 m springboard (with Yeoh Ken Nee), synchronised 10 m springboard (with Ooi Tze Liang). He succeeded in winning two silvers in both the synchronisation events and a bronze medal in another. In the 2011 World Aquatics Championships, Lomas competes in diving's 3 m springboard and 10 m platform. He finishes 11th in the former's finals, but only ranked 24th in the latter.

The 2012 FINA Diving World Cup held in London, United Kingdom saw Lomas and Huang Qiang earning Bronze in the Synchronized 3 metre springboard event and qualifying for the 2012 Summer Olympics. In the 2012 Summer Olympics held in London, United Kingdom, Lomas competed in two diving events. He was ranked 8th in the synchronised 3 m springboard event alongside Huang Qiang. In the 10 metre platform event, Lomas earned 434.95 points, and was eliminated in the preliminary round, finishing at the 19th spot.

Awards and recognition
Lomas was named Sarawak Sportsman of the Year for three times;  2005/2006, 2007/2008 and 2011/2012. He was also named as one of fifteen awardees for the Sarawak Youth and Sports Icon Award in 2011. At the 2015 UM Sports Awards, he was honored with the Lifetime Achievement Award.

Personal life
He retired from diving in May 2013. He had in 2015 graduated with distinction honours from Universiti Malaya, with a Bachelor in Sports Science (Sports Management) Degree. In 2017, he secured a master's degree in sports administration from the Russian International Olympic University. He is coaching part-time with the Selangor team and aspire to open a diving academy; either in Sarawak or Kuala Lumpur.

References

1990 births
Living people
People from Kuching
Malaysian male divers
Divers at the 2004 Summer Olympics
Divers at the 2008 Summer Olympics
Divers at the 2012 Summer Olympics
Olympic divers of Malaysia
Asian Games medalists in diving
Divers at the 2010 Asian Games
Divers at the 2006 Asian Games
Asian Games silver medalists for Malaysia
Asian Games bronze medalists for Malaysia
Commonwealth Games silver medallists for Malaysia
Commonwealth Games bronze medallists for Malaysia
Commonwealth Games medallists in diving
Medalists at the 2010 Asian Games
Southeast Asian Games gold medalists for Malaysia
Southeast Asian Games silver medalists for Malaysia
Southeast Asian Games medalists in diving
University of Malaya alumni
Divers at the 2006 Commonwealth Games
Divers at the 2010 Commonwealth Games
Competitors at the 2005 Southeast Asian Games
Competitors at the 2009 Southeast Asian Games
Competitors at the 2011 Southeast Asian Games
Medallists at the 2010 Commonwealth Games